Haja El Hamdaouia (28 October 1930 – 5 April 2021) was a Moroccan singer and songwriter, known for singing Moroccan Chaabi and Aita.

Biography 
El Hamdaouia was born in 28 October 1930 and grew up in Derb Sultan in Casablanca where she started singing from a young age. She sang in front of the "patchwork" Orchestra.

She started her career in the 1950s, performing the genre "El Aita al Marsaouia". This is one of the most popular styles of Moroccan traditional music. "El Aita" can be translated into "the call" or "the cry" in which performers sing about a particular cause. During the French protectorate, singers El Aita to beratee colonizers with the lyrics, calling on them to leave the country.

She performed at Salim Halali's cabaret in Maarif, .

El Hamdaouia was also known for her unique appearances on stage, inseparable from her "bendir," a big hand frame drum and  membranophone. The artist was famous for her classic hairstyles and colorful caftans on stage.

She created her own style of pop music with traditional Moroccan kaftan. Her songs are considered pop classics which were adapted by many current Moroccan pop musicians. She performed together with famous artists such as Cheb Khaled and Hamid Bouchnak.

After a week of suffering health complications that required her to be transferred to the hospital for medical supervision, El Hamdaouia died on 5 April 2021 at Cheikh Zaid hospital in Rabat, aged 90
.

Songs 
El Hamdaouia is famous for several songs such as:

 "Ha lkass Hlou" (duo with Hamid Bouchnak).
 "Daba Yji"
 "Jiti majiti" 
 "Dada ou hiyani" 
 "Mal hbibi’liya"
 "Hna mada bina"

References 

20th-century Moroccan women singers
People from Casablanca
1930 births
2021 deaths
21st-century Moroccan women singers